The 1971 Colgate Red Raiders football team was an American football team that represented Colgate University as an independent during the 1971 NCAA University Division football season. In its fourth season under head coach Neil Wheelwright, the team compiled a 6–4 record. For the first time since the 1944 season, the team named two players as captains, Thomas Doyle and Steve Morgan. 

The team played its home games at Andy Kerr Stadium in Hamilton, New York.

Schedule

Leading players 
Two trophies were awarded to the Red Raiders' most valuable players in 1971: 
 Brian Houseal, guard, received the Andy Kerr Trophy, awarded to the most valuable offensive player.
 Mike Harlow, defensive tackle, received the Hal W. Lahar Trophy, awarded to the most valuable defensive player.

Statistical leaders for the 1971 Red Raiders included: 
 Rushing: Mark van Eeghen, 846 yards and 11 touchdowns on 160 attempts
 Passing: Tom Parr, 720 yards, 41 completions and 6 touchdowns on 113 attempts
 Receiving: Steve Fraser, 381 yards and 3 touchdowns on 18 receptions
 Total offense: Tom Parr, 1,387 yards (720 passing, 667 rushing)
 Scoring: Two players with 66 points: Mark van Eeghen (11 touchdowns) and Tom Parr (11 touchdowns)
 All-purpose yards: Mark van Eeghen, 1,128 yards (846 rushing, 282 kickoff returning)

References

Colgate
Colgate Raiders football seasons
Colgate Red Raiders football